Gustavo Santos Costa most commonly known as Gustavo (born 25 June 1996 in Sergipe, Brazil) is a Brazilian footballer who plays as forward for Dornbirn 1913 in the Austrian Football Second League.

Career

Nagoya Grampus
Gustavo made his official debut for Nagoya Grampus in the J. League Division 1 on 18 October 2014 against Sanfrecce Hiroshima in Hiroshima Big Arch in Hiroshima, Japan. He subbed in the match in the 72nd minute replacing Riki Matsuda. Gustavo and his club lost the match 4-0. Gustavo was released by Nagoya Grampus, along with 8 other players, on 10 November 2016 following the club's relegation to J2 League.

Roasso Kumamoto
On 19 December 2016, Nagoya Grampus announced that Gustavo had joined J2 League side Roasso Kumamoto.

Đông Á Thanh Hóa
On 15 August 2022, Đông Á Thanh Hóa announced that Gustavo had joined 2022 V.League 1 for half of the season, he was replaced for Victor Kamhuka. He played 11 games and had 2 goals.

Dornbirn 1913
On 26 January 2023, Dornbirn 1913 announced that Gustavo had joined 2023–24 Austrian Football Second League for a season.

Career statistics

Achievements
Đông Á Thanh Hóa
Vietnamese Cup Third place: 2022

References

External links 
 

Profile at Nagoya Grampus

1996 births
Living people
Association football forwards
Brazilian footballers
Brazilian expatriate footballers
Brazilian expatriate sportspeople in Japan
J1 League players
Esporte Clube Bahia players
Nagoya Grampus players
Expatriate footballers in Japan
Sportspeople from Sergipe